St. Cloud is an unincorporated community in Ray County, in the U.S. state of Missouri and part of the Kansas City metropolitan area.

The community is 2.5 miles west-northwest of Richmond and one mile north of  Missouri Route 10. The West Fork of Crooked River flows past the north side of the community.

History
A variant name was "Saint Cloud Springs". The town site was platted as Saint Cloud Springs in 1881, taking its name from a spring near the original town site.

References

Unincorporated communities in Ray County, Missouri
Unincorporated communities in Missouri